Zaphrissa is an extinct genus of prehistoric amphibian which contains one species, Zaphrissa eurypelis, known from the Oligocene of Rott in Siebengebirge, Germany.

See also
 Prehistoric amphibian
 List of prehistoric amphibians

References

Painted frogs
Prehistoric frogs
Oligocene animals of Europe
Fossil taxa described in 1866
Taxa named by Edward Drinker Cope